Kostur may refer to:

Places
 Kostur, Bulgaria
 Kostur (Pirot), Serbia
 Kostur Point, Antarctica
 Kastoria, Greece

Other
 Kostur dialect
 Matúš Kostúr (born 1980), Slovak ice hockey player

See also